Bennett Sings Ellington: Hot & Cool is an album by Tony Bennett, released in 1999 to commemorate the centenary of Duke Ellington's birth.

Track listing 
All songs composed by Duke Ellington, except "Chelsea Bridge"; lyricists indicated.

 "Do Nothin' Till You Hear from Me" (Bob Russell) – 4:01
 "Mood Indigo" (Barney Bigard, Irving Mills) – 4:33
 "She's Got It Bad (And That Ain't Good)" (Paul Francis Webster) – 4:49
 "Caravan" (Mills, Juan Tizol) – 4:36
 "Chelsea Bridge" (Billy Strayhorn) – 3:59
 "Azure" (Mills) – 3:56
 "I'm Just a Lucky So-and-So" (David) – 3:39
 "In a Sentimental Mood" (Manny Kurtz, Mills) – 3:31
 "Don't Get Around Much Anymore" (Russell) – 3:16
 "Sophisticated Lady" (Mills, Parish) – 4:43
 "In a Mellow Tone" (Milt Gabler) – 6:54
 "Day Dream" (John La Touche, Billy Strayhorn) – 3:56
 "Prelude to a Kiss" (Gordon, Mills) – 4:55
 "It Don't Mean a Thing (If It Ain't Got That Swing)" (Mills) – 4:02

Personnel 
 Tony Bennett – vocals, producer
 Gray Sargent – guitar
 Al Grey – trombone
 Wynton Marsalis – trumpet
 Joel Smirnoff – violin
 Ralph Sharon – piano
 Paul Langosch – double bass
 Clayton Cameron – drums
 Unidentified orchestra and big band (except for track 10)
 Ralph Burns – arranger, conductor
 Jorge Calandrelli - arranger, conductor
 Jesse Levy – contractor

Technical personnel 
 Don DeVito – a&r
 Josh Cheuse – art direction
 Rob Murphy – assistant engineer, assistant
 Jason Groucott – assistant
 Frank Harkins – design
 Joel Moss – engineer, mixing
 Danny Bennett – producer
 Vance Anderson – production coordination
 Nat Hentoff – liner notes
 Greg Calbi – mastering
 Herman Leonard – photography

References 

1999 albums
Tony Bennett albums
Duke Ellington tribute albums
Columbia Records albums
Albums arranged by Ralph Burns
Albums conducted by Ralph Burns
Albums produced by Phil Ramone
Grammy Award for Best Traditional Pop Vocal Album